Ahmadabad (also Romanized as Aḩmadābād) is a village in Chalanchulan Rural District, Silakhor District, Dorud County, Lorestan Province, Iran. At the 2006 census, its population was 288, in 79 families.

References 

Towns and villages in Dorud County